Bassa-Gumna is an extinct Kainji language of Nigeria. It was spoken in Chanchaga, Niger state, and Nasarawa, near the Bassa homeland. Speakers have shifted to Hausa.

Gumna is situated about 10 kilometers to the west of the Tegina-Zungeru road. Around 1963, Bassa-Gumna speakers moved to the road and currently live in Yakila town, where only two semi-speakers were found in 1986. They also live two nearby hamlets, both called Bassa, which are located west of the road.

References

Basa languages
Languages of Nigeria
Extinct languages of Africa
Languages extinct in the 1980s